Corysthea is a genus of leaf beetles in the subfamily Eumolpinae. It is distributed in South America.

Species

 Corysthea admissa Bechyné, 1953
 Corysthea boliviana Bechyné, 1951
 Corysthea chalybaea Lefèvre, 1891
 Corysthea colasi Bechyné, 1951
 Corysthea cribrata Lefèvre, 1891
 Corysthea funesta (Baly, 1864)
 Corysthea funesta continentalis Bechyné, 1951
 Corysthea funesta funesta (Baly, 1864)
 Corysthea funesta vogli Bechyné, 1955
 Corysthea gregalis (Weise, 1921)
 Corysthea humilis Lefèvre, 1884
 Corysthea impressicollis Lefèvre, 1885
 Corysthea nigripennis Lefèvre, 1877
 Corysthea nigritarsis Lefèvre, 1888
 Corysthea peruviana Bechyné, 1951
 Corysthea pohli Bechyné, 1951
 Corysthea rufa (Weise, 1921)
 Corysthea ruficollis Lefèvre, 1889
 Corysthea rugulosa Lefèvre, 1889
 Corysthea santarema Bechyné, 1951

Synonyms:
 Corysthea glabrata (Fabricius, 1801): moved to Chalcophana
 Corysthea subaenea (Weise, 1929): synonym of Corysthea funesta (Baly, 1864)

References

Eumolpinae
Chrysomelidae genera
Beetles of South America
Taxa named by Joseph Sugar Baly